Chicherina, officially Yulia Dmitrievna Chicherina, is a Russian pop-rock artist. She has been performing since 1997 and is part of the wave of Uralic rock along with Nautilus Pompilius and Chaif.

Biography
Chicherina was born in 1978 Sverdlovsk, now known as Yekaterinburg. In 1997, she formed her own band.

Chicherina has expressed support for the self-proclaimed Donetsk People's Republic and Luhansk People's Republic in the Russo-Ukraine War. This led to her being banned from performing in the FIFA ”fan zone” in Rostov-on-Don during the 2018 World Cup. In March 2022 she was filmed taking down a Ukrainian flag in the city of Enerhodar, which was occupied during the 2022 Russian invasion of Ukraine.

Discography

Albums
2000 – Dreams
2001 – Flow
2002 – Dots (Live)
2004 – Off/On
2006 –  Musical Movie 
2007 –  Man-Bird

Singles

2000 – Tu-Lu-La
2001 – Road
2009 – I've Been Sewing The Dress
2009 – Christmas
2011 –  Dangerous

References

1978 births
Living people
Russian rock singers
20th-century Russian singers
20th-century Russian women singers
21st-century Russian singers
21st-century Russian women singers
Recipients of the Order of Friendship (South Ossetia)
Russian nationalists
Anti-Ukrainian sentiment in Russia